Master of Paradise is the eighth studio album by guitarist Tony MacAlpine, released on November 2, 1999 through Shrapnel Records. This album marks the first (and so far only) time MacAlpine himself sang on any of his releases; only two of the tracks are instrumental. 

Early pressings suffered from a mastering error which resulted in the overall volume being very low. This was corrected on later pressings, but yet another manufacturing error arose afterwards which remained uncorrected, this time involving the track listing: the order was printed incorrectly on the back cover, along with an image of MacAlpine mistakenly reversed to show him playing a left-handed guitar. The correct track listing is shown below.

Critical reception

Steve Huey at AllMusic gave Master of Paradise three stars out of five, saying that it was not a stylistic departure from MacAlpine's previous albums while highlighting MacAlpine's singing: "The results aren't always incredible, but MacAlpine generally gets the job done, solidly if unspectacularly." He also likened his neoclassical guitar work to that of Yngwie Malmsteen and recommended the album for fans of shred guitar.

Track listing

Personnel
Tony MacAlpine – vocals, guitar, keyboard, engineering, production
Atma Anur – drums
Larry Dennison – bass
Brian Levi – engineering, mixing
Albert Law – editing, mastering

References

External links
In Review: Tony MacAlpine "Master Of Paradise" at Guitar Nine Records

Tony MacAlpine albums
1999 albums
Shrapnel Records albums